Ignazio Spalla (5 May 1924 – 9 February 1995), best known as Pedro Sanchez, was an Italian film actor.

Born in Siena, Spalla was mainly active in Spaghetti Westerns, usually playing roles of Mexicans, gunfighters and outlaws. His first roles of weight were in 1965, in Marino Girolami's Bullet in the Flesh and in Giorgio Ferroni's Blood for a Silver Dollar.

In the 1970s he focused his activity in the subgenre of comic spaghetti, and his career basically declined together with Italo-Western. Outside this genre, Spalla's credits include Eduardo De Filippo's Shoot Loud, Louder... I Don't Understand, Lucio Fulci's The Conspiracy of Torture, and Pasquale Festa Campanile's Hitch-Hike.

Partial filmography 

Two Gangsters in the Wild West (1964) - Uomo con Rio
Bullet in the Flesh (1964) - Slim McClear
I figli del leopardo (1964) - Babalone's Henchman
Blood for a Silver Dollar (1965) - Granjero
Two Sergeants of General Custer (1965) - Northern Adjutant
Perché uccidi ancora (1965) - Rojo
Seven Golden Men Strike Again (1966)
Go with God, Gringo (1966) - Mexico
Thompson 1880 (1966) - Pancho - Brady's Henchman
Shoot Loud, Louder... I Don't Understand (1966) - Carmelo Vitiello
Two Sons of Ringo (1966) - El Indio
Pecos Cleans Up (1967) - Dago
Son of Django (1967) -  Thompson
La morte non conta i dollari (1967) - Pablo Rodriguez
 No Diamonds for Ursula (1967) - Caravella
Cjamango (1967) - Paco
Any Gun Can Play (1967) - Pajondo / Bahunda
Don't Wait, Django... Shoot! (1967) - Barrica
I barbieri di Sicilia (1967)
Johnny Hamlet (1968) - Guild
Vengeance (1968) - Laredo's Henchman (uncredited)
May God Forgive You... But I Won't (1968) - Garcia Ramirez 'Barrica'
Zorro the Fox (1968) - Sergeant Gomez
The Nephews of Zorro (1968) - Sergeante Alvarez
Pagó cara su muerte (1969)
Sabata (1969) - Carrincha
The Conspiracy of Torture (1969) - Catalano
Quintana (1969) - Pater Mansueto
Adiós, Sabata (1969) - Escudo
Reverend's Colt (1970) - Meticcio
Tara Pokì (1971) - Don Fifi
Return of Sabata (1971) - Bronco
La vergine di Bali (1972) - Pedro Porfirio
Sotto a chi tocca! (1972) - Pietro
Three Supermen of the West (1973) - Navajo Joe
Seven Nuns in Kansas City (1973) - Bart
Carambola (1974) - Mexican Leader
Trinity Plus the Clown and a Guitar (1975) - Poker Player
White Fang and the Gold Diggers (1975) - Dollar
White Fang and the Hunter (1975) - Dollar
Il sogno di Zorro (1975) - Sergeant Garcia
Hitch-Hike (1977) - Mexican Way Station Clerk (final film role)

References

External links 
 

People from Siena
1924 births
1995 deaths
Male Spaghetti Western actors
Italian male film actors
20th-century Italian male actors